Louise Pitre (born January 1, 1957) is a Canadian actress in musical theatre. She performs on Broadway and in Canada. She is best known for her role as Donna Sheridan in the ABBA-themed musical Mamma Mia!, which earned her a 2002 Tony Award nomination.

Early life
Pitre was born in Smooth Rock Falls, Ontario; her family moved to Montreal and then to Welland during her childhood. Her first language is French. At age seven, she began to play piano, eventually taking professional lessons. She attended the University of Western Ontario and graduated with a bachelor's degree in music education. After performing in a college musical, however, she began combining music with acting on stage.

Career
Pitre moved to Toronto to pursue a musical theatre career. Her performance as Fantine in the musical adaptation of Les Misérables earned her acclaim in Toronto, Montreal, and Paris. In 1992 she portrayed French singer Edith Piaf in three productions of Piaf.

Other musicals she was involved with include Jacques Brel is Alive and Well and Living in Paris, I Love You, You're Perfect, Now Change, The World Goes 'Round, Blood Brothers, Tartuffe, Who's Afraid of Virginia Woolf?, The Roar of the Greasepaint - The Smell of the Crowd, Applause, and Rock 'n' Roll.

Pitre auditioned in New York City for the musical Napoleon being produced in London, but was turned down for the role of Josephine. The director, Francesca Zambello, told her she was perfect for a show she was also casting in Toronto entitled "Mamma Mia!" Pitre auditioned for the role of Donna Sheridan. Although initially hesitant about the part, she accepted after seeing the show. She performed the role in Toronto and in its United States national tour, and after 18 months, was asked to play the role on Broadway.

Reviews were positive; Variety Magazine, although unenthusiastic about the musical, called her "a terrific Donna", The New York Times called her performance "delightful" and praised her "terrific pop belter's voice", and the San Francisco Chronicle praised her for making the show "a dramatic showstopper". For her performance, she was nominated for the Tony Award for Best Performance by a Leading Actress in a Musical, and won the National Broadway Touring Award and an award from the San Francisco Theatre Critics Circle. Pitre left the show in October 2003.

Pitre performed as Mrs. Lovett in Sweeney Todd with Calgary Opera in 2003. and as Annie in Annie Get Your Gun in 2005.

Pitre has released several CDs including, All My Life Has Led To This, featuring songs in English and French, Shattered, La vie en rouge (all French) and Songs My Mother Taught Me.  She can also be heard on the cast recordings of Could You Wait?, a show she co-wrote with W.J. Matheson and Diane Leah, Kristina playing the role of Ulrika and Les Miserables (role of Fantine) in the Paris cast recording.

She starred as Mayor Babs Belgoody and Ma Ferd in the Toronto production of The Toxic Avenger at the Danforth Music Hall from October 2009 through January 2010 with Dancap Productions. She was on stage in summer 2010 in Love, Loss and What I Wore and finished the year to positive reviews of her performance as Toad in A Year With Frog and Toad at Lorraine Kimsa Theatre for Young People. She garnered her sixth Dora Mavor Moore Award nomination for this performance and captured Best Actress in a Musical with an inaugural Toronto Theatre Critics' Award.

Pitre is a founding artist of Theatre 20, a musical theatre company in Toronto formed by artists in 2009, and headlined their first project, a workshop of the first English translation of the French musical Les Belles Soeurs. She also performed in Theatre 20's 2011 Concert Series at the Panasonic Theatre.

On June 1, 2011, she performed a solo, self-produced, one-night, sold-out concert La Vie en Rouge at the St. Lawrence Centre for the Arts' Jane Mallett Theatre. The French album, of the same name, was recorded live, off the floor, at Number 9 Audio Group in Toronto and released in conjunction with the concert. This theatrical event was documented to video and some highlights are shared on Louise Pitre’s YouTube channel.

In July 2011, Toronto Life magazine named "Louise Pitre's musical theatre renaissance" as #12 in their "50 Reasons to Love Toronto" feature article.

In 2011 she was the host of Star Portraits on Bravo! and performing  solo concerts across North America.

Pitre wrote and performed in a show about her life, On the Rocks, in 2013. During the ongoing COVID-19 pandemic restrictions, Louise sought an opportunity to stream a filmed version of On the Rocks in May 2021 through Stream Stage Productions. In 2014 she once more performed with Theatre 20, in the musical Company; the show received an unfavourable review from the Toronto Star, although Pitre's performance was praised.

In 2016 Pitre performed in London, Ontario with Brendan Wall and Emm Gryner in The Grand Theatre production of Joni Mitchell: River. Later that year, she performed with Kenneth Welsh in the show A Coal Mine Christmas at Toronto's Coal Mine Theatre.

Other musical theatre performances include Pitre’s META’s (Montreal English Theatre Awards) nominated role of Edith Piaf in the 2018 North American premiere of The Angel & The Sparrow presented at the Segal Centre for Performing Arts in Montreal under the direction of Gordon Greenberg. In the spring of 2019, she played Adult Marie van Goethem in Marie, Dancing Still; music by Stephen Flaherty and book and lyrics by Lynn Ahrens. This premiere production, directed and choreographed by Susan Stroman was presented by the 5th Avenue Theatre in Seattle, Washington. Also in the spring of 2019, Louise Pitre broke gender boundaries by playing the role of Doctor Madden (Doctor Fine) in the Toronto, Off-Mirvish production by The Musical Stage Company of Next To Normal at the CAA Theatre. In the fall of 2019, The Angel & The Sparrow was brought to Toronto by Mirvish Productions again under the direction of Gordon Greenberg and retitled Piaf/Dietrich, A Legendary Affair at which time Louise reprised her role as Edith Piaf opposite Jayne Lewis as Marlene Dietrich.

Theatre awards & nominations

Discography

Solo albums

Musicals; cast recording credits

See also 
 List of Canadian musicians
 List of Canadian actors
 List of caricatures at Sardi's restaurant

References

External links
 
 
  
  

1957 births
Living people
Canadian musical theatre actresses
People from Cochrane District
Franco-Ontarian people
Fellows of the Royal Conservatory of Music
University of Western Ontario alumni
Dora Mavor Moore Award winners
Theatre World Award winners